Suleiman II (15 April 1642 – 22 June 1691) ( Süleymān-i sānī) was the Sultan of the Ottoman Empire from 1687 to 1691. After being brought to the throne by an armed mutiny, Suleiman and his grand vizier Fazıl Mustafa Pasha were successfully able to turn the tide of the War of the Holy League, reconquering Belgrade in 1690, as well as carrying out significant fiscal and military reforms.

Early life
Suleiman II was born on 15 April 1642 at Topkapı Palace in Constantinople, the son of Sultan Ibrahim and Aşub Sultan, a Serb woman originally named Katarina. Suleiman was only 3 months younger than his half-brother Mehmed IV, who was born on 2 January 1642. After the deposition and execution of his father in 1648, Suleiman's half-brother Mehmed came to the throne. On 21 October 1649, Suleiman along with his brothers Mehmed and Ahmed were circumcised.

In 1651, Suleiman was confined in the Kafes, a luxurious prison for royal princes within Topkapı Palace. This was done to avoid a rebellion. He stayed there for 36 years until he took the throne in 1687.

Reign

Shortly before he assumed the throne, the Ottomans suffered a major defeat at the second Battle of Mohács in 1687. In 1688, Suleiman II urgently requested the Mughal Emperor Aurangzeb for assistance against the rapidly advancing Austrians, during the Ottoman–Habsburg War, but most Mughal forces were engaged in the Deccan Wars and Aurangzeb ignored Suleiman's request to commit to any formal assistance to their desperate Ottoman allies. 

The previous ban on alcohol (which was publicly flouted in Istanbul and Galata) was energized under Suleiman, where he managed to demolish several alcohol shops, but this just led to owners bringing in more alcohol. 

Suleiman II appointed Köprülü Fazıl Mustafa Pasha as his Grand Vizier in 1689, leading to the reconquest of Belgrade in 1690. Later, the threat from the Russian Empire was renewed when they joined in an alliance with other European powers, while the Ottomans had lost the support of their Crimean vassals, who were forced to defend themselves from several Russian invasions. Under Köprülü's leadership, the Ottomans halted an Austrian advance into Serbia and crushed an uprising in Macedonia and Bulgaria until Köprülü was killed in the Battle of Slankamen by Austrian forces.

Family 
Suleiman II elevated six known concubines to the rank of consort, with the title of Kadin, used for the first time as a title rather than a rank.

He gave them various jewels and precious objects that belonged to Muazzez Sultan, one of her father's Haseki Sultan. These gifts were requisitioned when Ahmed II, son of Muazzez, succeeded Suleiman II on the throne.

The known consorts of Suleiman II were: 
Hatice Kadın. BaşKadin (first consort).
Behzad Kadın. She received a brooch and a diamond ring that belonged to Muazzez Sultan. 
Süğlün Kadın. She received a pair of pearl earrings, a pair of diamonds and a pendant set with 83 pearls. 
Şehsuvar Kadın. She received a pearl-encrusted ablution bowl and a pair of earrings. 
Zeyneb Kadın. She received jewelry as a gift in 1691. 
İvaz Kadın. She received jewelry as a gift in 1691.

Despite his six consorts, Suleiman II remained childless. It is not known whether this was due to his sterility, lack of sexual interest, or his precarious health conditions, which forced him to be bedridden for the final half of his short reign.

Death
Suleiman II had fell into a coma and was later brought to Edirne on 8 June 1691. He died on 22 June 1691 and his body was buried in Suleiman the Magnificent's tomb at Süleymaniye Mosque in Istanbul. His brother Ahmed succeeded him as Sultan.

Gallery

Sources

Bibliography

External links 

[aged 49]

1642 births
1691 deaths
Royalty from Istanbul
Ottoman people of the Great Turkish War
17th-century Ottoman sultans
Turks from the Ottoman Empire